Boquio is a small upland area south of Bolitho in west Cornwall, England, United Kingdom. It is situated approximately halfway between Praze-an-Beeble and Wendron in the civil parish of Wendron. There are several farmstead settlements bearing the names Boquio and Boquio Vean in the area.

References

Hamlets in Cornwall